The Virgin and Child with a Shoot of Olive is an oil on panel painting by Andrea Previtali, executed in 1512–1513, one of 192 paintings donated to the National Gallery, London in 1910 as part of the George Salting collection. The work was originally commissioned by the Gozzi family.

References

Bibliography
 Mauro Zanchi, Andrea Previtali il colore prospettico di maniera belliniana, Ferrari Editrice, 2009.
 Rodeschini Galati Maria Cristina, Andrea Previtali. La «Madonna Baglioni» e «Madonna con il bambino leggente tra san Domenico e santa Marta di Betania», Lubrina Editore, 2011, .

Paintings by Andrea Previtali
Paintings of the Madonna and Child
Collections of the National Gallery, London
1513 paintings